Events from the year 1539 in art.

Events

Works

Painting

 Hans Baldung – Virgin and Child
 Jacopo Bassano – Christ Among the Doctors
 Hans Holbein the Younger – Portrait of Anne of Cleves (probable date)

Births
 June 13 - Jost Amman, Swiss illustrator (died 1591)
 Pietro Facchetti, Italian painter primarily of portraits (died 1613)
 Hasegawa Tōhaku, Japanese painter and founder of the Hasegawa school of Japanese painting during the Azuchi-Momoyama period (died 1610)

Deaths
 Isabella d'Este, Italian noblewoman (Marchioness of Mantua), art collector, and patroness (born 1474)
 Marco Palmezzano, Italian painter and architect (born 1460)
 Il Pordenone, Italian painter of the Venetian school, active during the Renaissance (born 1483)
 Giacomo Pacchiarotti, Italian painter (born 1474)

 
Years of the 16th century in art